|}

This is a list of House of Assembly results for the 1922 Tasmanian election.

Results by division

Bass

Darwin

Denison

Franklin

Wilmot

See also 

 1922 Tasmanian state election
 Members of the Tasmanian House of Assembly, 1922–1925
 Candidates of the 1922 Tasmanian state election

References 

Results of Tasmanian elections
1922 elections in Australia